The Zhuang  have a rich variety of customs and culture.

Festivals

"Sam Nyied Sam" the 3rd day of the 3rd month of the Chinese lunar calendar is one of the main festivals of the Zhuang celebrated by singing, dancing, games, and special food. At this time traditionally young men and women sing antiphonal songs to each other.

 
festival of the ancestor sacrifice of the 7th lunar month
the Duanwu medicine festival
Buffalo King Festival - celebrated in Niutouzhai Village, Wenshan County, where there is a Buffalo King Temple. The Zhuang have long worshipped the water buffalo.
bullfighting festival
Firstfruits Festival
Zhuang children's festival; dates chosen by each individual village

Stories

The Zhuang peoples of Yunnan and Guangxi have a rich tradition of written and unwritten stories.
Zhuang folk stories often take the form of songs. There are various folk tales, myths, legends, and historical poems and chants. For over one thousand years they have used Sawndip to write a wide variety of literature, including folk songs, operas, poems, scriptures, letters, contracts, and court documents.

There are many stories that are a thousand years old, or older. One, a fairy tale which has attracted much attention in recent years, is "The orphan girl and the rich girl." It is an early version of the story Cinderella (Zhuang "Dahgyax Dahbengz" Dah - indicates female,  means orphan and  means rich). It is found in Zhuang opera scripts. A 9th century Chinese translation of a Zhuang story entitled Ye Xian was written in the Miscellaneous Morsels from Youyang and the Sawndip versions we now have are quite similar. Analysis suggests these versions took shape no later than the 10th century. "The house-raising song" has been sung for over a thousand years. This song has two parts. The first part describes the construction of a traditional stilt house, and the second part describes customs to ward off evil from the new home. "The Origin of the Bronze Drum" tells of the origins of bronze drums that are like "stars" (such drums have a star in the middle of them), that they are as many as the stars of the sky and like stars can ward off evil spirits.

The Zhuang have their own scriptures written in poetical form such as the Baeu Rodo about the creation of the world.

As well as indigenous stories many stories from other peoples such as the Han Chinese have become part of the Zhuang literary tradition. Whilst the original Chinese opera of "The Legend of Wenlong" has been lost, the story has been preserved in Zhuang texts.

"The cutting down the banana tree song" ("Kau Tam Gvoa")
"The song of the origin of bronze" ("Gvau Dong")
"The rice paddy-planting song"
"Village visitation songs"
"Wine banquet songs"
"The national partition song"
"Banlong and Banli"
Poems of the Poya Songbook
"The escape from marriage song"
"Yiluo and Diling"
"Buloakdvo"
"Tea origin songs"
Swqmo: records of Zhuang history, ethnic relations, astronomy, farming technology, literary arts, religious beliefs, customs and traditions, and so on.

Folk arts

Zhuang folk arts include music and dance:

Music
Masa classical music: classical orchestras of Masa Village, Maguan County, Yunnan
Zhuang ceremonial music
Bawu: a type of Zhuang folk music dating back to ancient times
Mubala: ancient Zhuang wind instrument
Huqin: stringed instrument made from a water buffalo horn or horse bone; may be two-stringed or four-stringed
Svaeu'na toasting they dance and sing

Dances
There are many types of Zhuang dance.

bronze drum dance
straw man dance
water buffalo dance
paper horse dance
hand towel dance
sun dance

Handicrafts
Traditional Zhuang folk handicrafts includes the following.

bird totem hats
elephant trunk shoes reflecting Zhuang elephant worship
totem back carriers, consisting of fish, bird, and abstract symbolic designs
cloth monkey medicine bags
embroidered balls
spinning tops
wood prints
paper
traditional waterwheels
traditional brocades and weavings
silver jewelry
straw mats
bamboo basket weaving
rattan
Paeng'vae: a type of linen made of grass leaves and hemp fibers, made by weaving the two 90 degrees with each other

Religion
Most Zhuang follow traditional animist practices known as Mo or Shigong which include elements of ancestor worship. The Mo have their own sutra and professional priests known as Bu Mo who traditionally use chicken bones for divination. In Mo, the creator is known as Bu Luotuo and the universe is tripartite, with all things composed from the three elements of heaven, earth, and water.

There are also a number of Buddhists, Taoists, and Christians among the Zhuang.

sacrificing to the field deity
mountain sacrifices
worshipping Zoa'nongz, the god of the ndoang (forest)
sacrifices to Zoachu, the sun deity and original ancestor spirits now living in trees of ancient forests
sacrifices to the mother tree or mih maix (among the Dai or Tu of Wenshan)
Longdvaen festival: theatric performances in Guichao Township, Funing County
Opening the seedlings' door ceremony: a healthy, beautiful girl is chosen to plant the first seedling
Ceremony for repelling insects: insects are loaded onto paper boats, which are floated away in the water while drums and gongs are beaten
Sacrifices to Nong Zhigao in the 6th and 7th lunar months; purple-dyed glutinous rice is offered, and sometimes cattle
offerings to the sun: In Shangguo Village, Xichou County, Zhuang women bathe in the river, put on their traditional clothing and headdresses, and then make offerings to the sun with yellow glutinous rice, which they carry up Sun Mountain.
Sky Sacrifices: practiced in Bahao (Pya'Kau), Guangnan County, which a wooden hall on Bozhe Mountain is dedicated for
hvaeng ting Svaeu (townhall shrine) sacrifices: in Guima Village, Guangnan County
sweeping the village to chase away evil
sacrifice to the song immortal: shrine in Ake Village, Guangnan County
reception of the Princess Huanggu
sacrifices to bronze drums
Paeng'zong: banners hung during sacrifice ceremonies for funerals
Paengban: long banners hung during sacrifice ceremonies to repel evil
Paengsaeh: banners hung during animal sacrifices for religious ceremonies

Language

The Zhuang languages are a group of mutually unintelligible languages of the Tai family, heavily influenced by nearby dialects of Chinese. The Standard Zhuang language is based on a northern dialect but few people learn it, therefore Zhuang people from different dialect areas use one of a number of Chinese varieties to communicate with each other. According to a 1980s survey, 42% of Zhuang people are monolingual in Zhuang, while 55% are bilingual in Zhuang and Chinese. Whilst according to some semi-official sources "In Guangxi, compulsory education is bilingual in Zhuang and Chinese, with a focus on early Zhuang literacy." in fact only small percentage of schools teach written Zhuang. Zhuang is traditionally written using logograms based on Chinese characters ("Sawndip"), and Standard Zhuang, which was written in Latin script, with a few added Cyrillic letters for tone, between 1957 and 1982, and is now officially written using only Latin letters, even though Sawndip are still more often used in less formal domains. Its Wikipedia is za.wikipedia.org.

Traditional medicine

Zhuang folk medicine has a history of over one thousand years. In Sawndip texts thousands of Zhuang medical terms have been identified and some terms have entered into Chinese medical dictionaries, and in Southern China some hospitals have Zhuang Medicine departments.

Samcaet: the three-seven (Panax notoginseng), which has the Chinese nicknames "not to be exchanged for gold" and "the southern divine herb"
Laeujyaq: medicinal liquor

See also
Hmong customs and culture
Zhuang people
Dong people
Sui people
Yunnan Zhuang customs and culture

References

Johnson, Eric and Wang Mingfu. 2008. "Zhuang cultural and linguistic heritage". SIL International and the Nationalities Publishing House of Yunnan.

Culture in Guangxi
Zhuang people